Startforth Rural District was a rural district in the North Riding of the historic county of Yorkshire in the Pennines of northern England.

It was formed in 1894 under the Local Government Act 1894.  It constituted the part of the Teesdale Rural Sanitary District that was in the North Riding (the rest being in County Durham).

In 1974, the district was abolished and formed part of the Teesdale district of the non-metropolitan county of County Durham.

It comprised the area south of the River Tees between Cow Green Reservoir and Gainford, and north of the modern administrative border between County Durham and North Yorkshire.

The area is hilly and fairly sparsely populated. Places within it included;

Villages
Barningham
Boldron
Bowbank
Bowes
Brignall
Cotherstone
Gilmonby
Grassholme
Greta Bridge
Hutton Magna
Holwick
Hunderthwaite
Hury
Lartington
Mickleton
Ovington
Romaldkirk
Scargill
Startforth
Thringarth
Wycliffe

Dales
Baldersdale
Deep Dale
Lunedale
Teesdale (south side only)

Reservoirs and lakes
Balderhead
Blackton
Fish Lake
Grassholme
Hury
Selset

Fells and moors
Barningham Moor
Bowes Moor
Cotherstone Moor
Cronkley Fell
Holwick Fell
Hope Moor
Hunderthwaite Moor
Lune Moor
Mickle Fell
Scargill High Moor
Sleightholme Moor

Forests
Lune
Stainmore

Rivers and becks
River Balder
Deepdale Beck
River Greta

Roads
A66
A67
B6276
B6277

The Pennine Way also passes through the area.

External links
A Vision of Britain Through Time : Startforth Rural District

History of County Durham
History of North Yorkshire
Districts of England abolished by the Local Government Act 1972
Districts of England created by the Local Government Act 1894
Rural districts of the North Riding of Yorkshire